The women's hammer throw at the 2022 World Athletics Championships was held at the Hayward Field in Eugene on 15 and 17 July 2022.

Records
Before the competition records were as follows:

Qualification standard
The standard to qualify automatically for entry was 72.50 m.

Schedule
The event schedule, in local time (UTC−7), was as follows:

Results

Qualification 

Qualification: Qualifying Performance 73.50 (Q) or at least 12 best performers (q) advanced to the final.

Final

References

Hammer throw
Hammer throw at the World Athletics Championships